Watsoniomyces is a single-species fungal genus in the family Lichinaceae. It contains the saxicolous (rock-dwelling) crustose lichen Watsoniomyces obsoletus. The genus was circumscribed in 2021 by David Hawksworth, Mark Powell, and Toby Spribille to contain the species formerly known as Lecidea lichenicola. Molecular phylogenetic analysis showed that the species belonged to the family Lichinaceae in the order Lichinomycetes. The original material of Lecidea lichenicola was examined and determined to actually be a different species, Trapelia glebulosa. Further research showed that the earliest available name for this lichen is Lecidea obsoleta (originally described by William Nylander in 1865), and so a modern collection was used to neotypify the species. Watsoniomyces obsoletus grows on chalk pebbles, and is the first known member of the Lichinomycetes that has an  thallus.

References

Lichinomycetes
Ascomycota genera
Lichens described in 1865
Lichen genera
Taxa named by Toby Spribille
Taxa named by David Leslie Hawksworth